The CONEX box (Container, express) was a type of cargo container developed during the Korean War that was used to transport and store supplies during the Korean and Vietnam wars. It was reinvented by Malcom McLean to form the standard Intermodal shipping container (often called an ISO box, after ISO 6346) that is used widely by container shipping companies today.

History
The use of standardized steel and aluminum shipping containers began during the late 1940s and early 1950s, when commercial shipping operators and the US military started developing such units. During World War II, the US Army began experiments with containers to ship supplies to the front lines. Cargo was being delayed at ports due to the time required by break bulk loading and offloading of ships. In addition the supplies suffered from pilferage and in-transit damage. In 1948 the U.S. Army Transportation Corps developed the "Transporter", a rigid, corrugated steel container, able to carry .

After proving successful in Korea, the Transporter was developed into the Container Express (CONEX) box system in late 1952. CONEXs could be stacked three high, and protected their contents from the elements. By 1965, the US military had some 100,000 CONEX boxes, and by 1967, over 100,000 more had been procured to support the escalation of the Vietnam War, making this the world's first intercontinental application of intermodal containers. More than three quarters were shipped only once, because they remained in theatre. The CONEX boxes were as useful to the soldiers as their contents, in particular as storage facilities where there were no other options.

The term "CONEX" remains in common use in the US military to refer to the similar but larger ISO-standard shipping containers.

See also
 Intermodal container
 Containerization

Notes

References

Intermodal containers